"C'mon" is an instrumental track by Dutch DJ Tiësto and American DJ Diplo. It was released on 11 May 2010 in the Netherlands, the United Kingdom and the United States on iTunes. It is the first single from the Tiësto mixed compilation Club Life, Vol. 1 - Las Vegas.

Music video 
The music video premiered on Tiësto's official YouTube channel on 19 May 2010. The video was shot at Ultra Music Festival in 2010 and contains extracts of Tiësto and Diplo sets. It was directed by Alan Ferguson.

Track listing
Digital download (MF029)
 "C'mon" (Original Mix) – 5:17

12-inch (MAD118)
 "C'mon" (Original Mix) – 5:17
 "C'mon" (Totally Krossed Out Remix) – 5:52

Free digital download
 "C'mon" (Maestro Harrell 2016 Remix) – 4:23

"Catch 'Em by Surprise" version 

"C'mon (Catch 'Em by Surprise)" is a song by Dutch DJ Tiësto and American DJ Diplo. It features vocals by American rapper Busta Rhymes. It was released on 14 January 2011 in the Netherlands, United Kingdom and Finland. The single was released in the United States on iTunes 24 January 2011.

"C'mon (Catch 'Em by Surprise)" is the vocal version of the 2010 single "C'mon". The song was meant to be the first single of an upcoming Tiësto album which was never released in favor of creating the Club Life compilation series..

Music video 
The music video premiered on Tiësto's official YouTube Channel on 17 December 2010. It features Busta Rhymes who is rapping around rap dancers.

Track listings
Digital download (MF036)
 "C'Mon (Catch 'Em by Surprise)" (Radio Edit) – 3:32

CD-Maxi (WOS089)
 "C'mon (Catch 'Em by Surprise)" (Radio Edit) – 3:32
 "C'mon (Catch 'Em by Surprise)" (Extended Club Mix) – 5:13
 "C'mon (Catch 'Em by Surprise)" (Instrumental) – 3:32
 "C'mon (Catch 'Em by Surprise)" (Acapella) – 3:29

Charts

Year-end charts

Certifications

References

2010 singles
2011 singles
Tiësto songs
Song recordings produced by Diplo
Hip house songs
2010 songs
Songs written by Tiësto
Wall of Sound (record label) singles
Songs written by Diplo
Songs written by Busta Rhymes
Music videos directed by Alan Ferguson (director)